Loganair Flight 670A (LC670A) was a scheduled cargo flight for the Royal Mail from Edinburgh-Turnhouse Airport, Scotland to Belfast International Airport. On 27 February 2001 the Short 360 operating the flight ditched in the Firth of Forth off Edinburgh at around 17:30 local time; the two crewmembers' bodies were found in the wreckage a few hours after the crash.

Aircraft and crew

The accident aircraft was a Short 360-100 turboprop airliner manufactured by Short Brothers Limited in 1987, constructor's serial number SH 3723 and registered G-BNMT. It was powered by two Pratt & Whitney Canada PT6A-67R engines. Its passenger seats had been removed for use as a freighter and its Certificate of Airworthiness was valid until 15 October 2001. Maximum certified takeoff weight of the Short 360 is 12,292 kg (27,100 lb).

The crew consisted of 58-year-old Carl Mason, holding a valid Airline Transport Pilot's licence and with 13,569 hours' flying experience, as the captain. The first officer was 29-year-old Russell Dixon, also with a valid licence and 438 total flight hours.

Accident

At 17:10 local time the first officer requested clearance and, after a short delay, the crew taxied to depart from runway 06. With the pilot flying, a normal takeoff was followed by a normal reduction in power at 1,200 feet amsl. At 2,200 feet the co-pilot selected the anti-icing systems on while the pilot changed to a new radio frequency. Four seconds later the torque indicators for both engines rapidly fell to zero and the aircraft suffered a complete loss of propeller thrust.
As the first officer radioed a Mayday call on the Air traffic control frequency, the pilot initiated a descent with a reduced airspeed of 110 kt while turning right towards the coast. Realizing they could not reach shore, the crew prepared for ditching. At an airspeed of 86 kt with a 6.8 degree nose up and 3.6 degree left wing down attitude the aircraft impacted the water heading 109 degrees magnetic.

Aftermath

The aircraft was found 65 metres off shore in a 45 degree nose down attitude, with the forward half of the fuselage submerged in a water depth of approximately 6 metres. The flight deck was almost completely destroyed and the fuselage was firmly embedded in the sand. The empennage had separated and was found floating 100 metres to the east of the main wreckage. Both crew seats remained attached to the flight deck floor with no failure of the safety harnesses. The cockpit voice recorder (CVR) and flight data recorder (FDR) were both recovered intact.
The Short 360 was eventually salvaged with some difficulty, and was dismantled before it was transported to Air Accidents Investigation Branch (AAIB) headquarters at Farnborough for a detailed examination.

Cause

Upon investigation, it was concluded that the crash had been caused primarily by the lack of an established practical procedure for flight crews to install engine air intake covers in adverse weather conditions.

The aircraft landed at Edinburgh Airport, Scotland, at midnight in snow conditions and was then parked heading directly into moderate to strong surface winds for approximately 17 hours. Because no protecting plugs were put inside the engine intakes, the wind drove a significant amount of snow into the intakes. The intake plugs were not carried as part of the aircraft's onboard equipment and they were not readily available at Edinburgh Airport. Information concerning freezing weather conditions in the aircraft manufacturer's maintenance manual had not been included in the airline's Short 360 Operations Manual and was therefore not complied with. The AAIB discovered that large volumes of snow or slush could have accumulated where it would not have been readily visible to the crew during a pre-flight inspection (the engine intakes on a Short 360 are about 2.8 m (9 ft) above the ground). On takeoff this snow changed the engine intake air flow, causing both engines to flame out after both engines' anti-ice vanes were simultaneously opened as per the standard operating procedure. It was noted by the investigators that selecting engine anti-ice 'on' sequentially with a time interval between would have prevented a simultaneous dual engine flameout.

Similar occurrence

During the course of the investigation the AAIB was made aware of a similar incident eight years before the loss of G-BNMT. A Short 360 operated by a different airline suffered a dual engine power loss while on its takeoff run. The source of the problem was found to be the accumulation of ice and snow during operation in sub-zero temperatures.

Recommendations

As a result of this incident several recommendations were released by the AAIB and the aircraft manufacturer suggested changes to current operations of Short 360 aircraft in near-zero or sub-zero temperature conditions, including:
 Flight Operation Department Communication 17/2001 published on 20 October 2001 by the AAIB.
 All Operator Message SD002/02 released by Short Brothers on 4 March 2002.
 Recommendations 2002-39, 2002–40 and 2002–41 based on findings of the investigation, issued by the AAIB.

References

 Aircraft Accident Report 2/2003: Report on the Accident to  SD3-60, G-BNMT near Edinburgh Airport on 27 February 2001
 Appendices to Aircraft Accident Report 2/2003
 

Accidents and incidents involving the Short 360
Aviation accidents and incidents in 2001
Aviation accidents and incidents in Scotland
2001 in Scotland
Firth of Forth
2001 disasters in the United Kingdom
February 2001 events in the United Kingdom
Airliner accidents and incidents involving ditching